Jyotiba Temple is a holy site of Hinduism near Wadi Ratnagiri  in Kolhapur district of Maharashtra state in western India. The deity of the temple is known by the same name. An annual fair takes place on the full moon night of the Hindu months of Chaitra and Vaishakha.

Location
Jyotiba temple is situated at a height of 3124 feet above sea level and is dedicated to Jyotiba. The temple is 18 km north-west of Kolhapur and around 55  km from Sangli. According to the tradition, the original Kedareshwar temple was built by Navji Saya. In 1730, Ranoji Shinde built the present temple in its place. This shrine is 57 ft x 37 ft x 77 ft high including the spire. The second temple of Kedareshwar is 49 ft x 22 ft x 89 ft high. This shrine was constructed by Daulatrao Shinde in 1808. The third temple of Ramling is 13 ft x 13 ft x 40 ft high including its dome. This temple was constructed in circa 1780 by Malji Nilam Panhalkar. The interior of the temple is ancient. There are other few temples and Light-towers in the premises.

Mythology 

Legend says Vishnu, Brahma and Shiva came together to incarnate as the deity Jyotiba who eventually destroyed the evil Ratnasura. Jyotiba helped Ambabai in her fight with the demons. He founded his kingdom on this mountain, and belongs to the Nath sampradaya. Lord Jyotiba destroyed Raktabhoja Rakshasa, and Ratnasura Rakshasa thus liberating the region from their tyranny. The idol of Lord Jyotiba is four-armed.

Festival
On Chaitra Poornima of Hindu calendar, a big fair is held, when lacs of devotees come with tall (Sasan) sticks. Shree kshretra padali, vihe, kolhapur chatrapati, himmat bahadur chavan, Gwalior shinde kival navajibaba are some sasankathis  in this festival. Due to scattering of ‘Gulal’ by the devotees the entire temple complex appears pink and even the Jyotiba hill has turned pink, resulting in people referring to the temple as the Pink temple. Being Sunday is day dedicated to Jyotiba, there is always rush over there.

See also 
 Nath
 Mahalakshmi Temple, Kolhapur
 Temblai Temple, Kolhapur
 Binkhambi Ganesh Temple, Kolhapur
 Audumbar Dattatrya Temple
 Narsobawadi temple
 Sangameshwar Shiva Temple, Haripur
 Sangli ganapati temple
 Kopeshwar Temple

Nearby Cities
 Kolhapur - 20 km
 Sangli - 55 km

Nearby Railway Stations
 Chhatrapati Shahu Maharaj Terminus, Kolhapur - 20 km 
 Sangli railway station - 55 km

References

External links

 Location in Wikimapia

Tourist attractions in Kolhapur district
Hindu temples in Maharashtra